The 2008–09 season is Brighton & Hove Albion's 107th year in existence and third consecutive season in League One. Along with competing in League One, the club also participated in the FA Cup and the Football League Cup.

This was manager Micky Adams' first season in his second spell at the club, having previously managed Brighton from 1999 to 2001. Adams was sacked on 21 February 2009, after a poor run of form left the side in the relegation zone. Former Yeovil Town manager Russell Slade took over the reins on 6 March, and guided the side to safety on the final day of the season, after the Seagulls had been eight points adrift with six games to play.

Squad details

Player info

Pre-season friendlies

Competitions

League One

Results

Table

Results Summary

Round by round

FA Cup

Football League Cup

Football League Trophy
Southern Section

League One Data

Season statistics

Appearances and goals

|}

Transfers

Transfers in

Transfers out

Loans in

Loans out

Kit profile

|
|
|
|}

References

External links 
 Official Site: 2007/2008 Fixtures & Results
 BBC Sport–Club Stats
 Soccerbase–Results | Squad Stats | Transfers

Brighton & Hove Albion F.C. seasons
Brighton and Hove Albion